Jacek Gilewski (born 25 January 1969) is a Polish archer. He competed in the men's individual and team events at the 1992 Summer Olympics.

References

External links
 

1969 births
Living people
Polish male archers
Olympic archers of Poland
Archers at the 1992 Summer Olympics
Sportspeople from Warsaw